Veverka (feminine: Veverková) is a Czech surname meaning "squirrel". Notable people with the surname include:

Joseph Veverka (born 1941), American astronomer
Richard Veverka (born 1987), Czech footballer
Vilém Veverka (born 1978), Czech oboist

See also
 
2710 Veverka, main-belt asteroid

Czech-language surnames